21-Hydroxypregnenolone, also known as prebediolone, as well as 3β,21-dihydroxypregn-5-en-20-one, is a naturally occurring and endogenous pregnane steroid, and an intermediate in the biosynthesis of 11-deoxycorticosterone (21-hydroxyprogesterone), corticosterone (11β,21-dihydroxyprogesterone), and other corticosteroids. It is formed from pregnenolone in the adrenal glands.

The 21-acetate ester of 21-hydroxypregnenolone, prebediolone acetate, is described as a glucocorticoid and has been used in the treatment of rheumatoid arthritis.

See also
 17α-Hydroxypregnenolone
 Progesterone
 17α-Hydroxyprogesterone

References

Diols
Human metabolites
Ketones
Pregnanes